Qalayxudat (also, Galaykhudat, Galakhudat, Kalaykhudat, and Kaleykhudat) is a village in the Quba District of Azerbaijan. The village forms part of the municipality of Khinalug.

References

External links

Populated places in Quba District (Azerbaijan)